The discography of the rock band Ocean Colour Scene, consists of ten studio albums and thirty-four singles.

Studio albums

Compilation albums

Live albums

Singles

Video albums
 1997: Times of Our Lives (VHS)
 1998: Travellers Tune (VHS)
 2003: Filmed from the Front Row (DVD)
 2008: Live at the Town Hall (DVD)
 2011: Moseley Shoals live in Birmingham (DVD)
 2013: Marchin' Already live at the Glasgow Barrowland (DVD)

References

Discographies of British artists
Discography